SMP Racing is the motor sport endurance racing team and also motorsport management created in 2013 by Boris Rotenberg, founder of the SMP Bank of Russia.

Description
The goal of SMP Racing is to train and unveil new talents. The team's training center is in Le Luc, France.

In November 2014, the team unveiled is first home-made car, the BR01, planned to run for the 2015 competitions

Drivers

Championships
 2018 Blancpain GT Series Endurance Cup
 2018 European Le Mans Series
 2018-19 FIA World Endurance Championship
 2018 Formula One World Championship (Williams Martini Racing)

Racing record

Complete FIA World Endurance Championship participations

Branding
SMP Racing also was a moniker for these teams, when SMP sponsored them:

 ADM Motorsport, a motor racing team based in Italy.
 AF Corse, a motor racing team based in Italy.
 AV Formula, a motor racing team based in Spain.
 Comtec Racing, a motor racing team based in the United Kingdom.
 Euronova Racing, a motor racing team based in Italy.
 Koiranen GP, a motor racing team based in Spain.
 Russian Bears Motorsport, a motor racing team based in Russia.
 Schmidt Peterson Motorsports, а motor racing team based in USA

See also
 Escuderia Telmex, a Mexican team founded by similar ambitions.

References

External links

 

Russian auto racing teams
FIA World Endurance Championship teams
European Le Mans Series teams
World Series Formula V8 3.5 teams
Racecar constructors
Sports management companies
WeatherTech SportsCar Championship teams

German Formula 3 teams
International GT Open teams
Blancpain Endurance Series teams
Formula Renault Eurocup teams
Auto racing teams established in 2013
24 Hours of Le Mans teams